is the sixth studio album by Japanese pop band Pizzicato Five. It was released on September 21, 1992 by the Nippon Columbia imprint Triad. The album marks a turn toward a more house music-influenced sound for the band.

Sweet Pizzicato Five was reissued by Readymade Records on September 30, 2000 and March 31, 2006.

Track listing

Charts

References

External links
 

1992 albums
Pizzicato Five albums
Nippon Columbia albums
Japanese-language albums